The Framée class consisted of four destroyers built for the French Navy at the beginning of the 20th century. One ship was sunk in a collision shortly after completion, but the others served during the First World War. One ship was sunk in a collision with a British cargo ship in 1916, but the others survived the war to be discarded in 1920–1921.

Design and description
They displaced  at deep load. Their complement consisted of four officers and forty-four enlisted men.

The Framée-class ships were armed with a single  gun forward of the bridge and six  Hotchkiss guns, three on each broadside. They were fitted with two single  torpedo tubes, one between the funnels and the other on the stern. Two reload torpedoes were also carried.

Ships

Citations

Bibliography

 
 

Destroyer classes
Destroyers of the French Navy
 
 
Ship classes of the French Navy